Maria Blower (born 21 August 1964) is a female retired English road racing cyclist. She competed in the road race  at the 1984 Summer Olympics, finishing 29th, and at the 1988 Summer Olympics, finishing 6th.

She also represented England in the road race, at the 1990 Commonwealth Games in Auckland, New Zealand.

References

External links
 

1964 births
Living people
English female cyclists
Olympic cyclists of Great Britain
Cyclists at the 1984 Summer Olympics
Cyclists at the 1988 Summer Olympics
Cyclists at the 1990 Commonwealth Games
Sportspeople from Leicester
Commonwealth Games competitors for England